Alice Heron Maxwell (9 October 1860–24 July 1949) was a New Zealand custodian. She was born in Kilmore, Victoria, Australia on 9 October 1860.

References

1860 births
1949 deaths
People from Kilmore, Victoria
Australian emigrants to New Zealand